"Lobet den Herren alle, die ihn ehren" (Praise the Lord, all who honour him) is a sacred morning song with a text by Paul Gerhardt and a melody by Johann Crüger, who first published it in the fifth edition of his hymnal Praxis Pietatis Melica in 1653. The Lutheran hymn is still popular and appears in hymnals including the Protestant Evangelisches Gesangbuch and the Catholic Gotteslob.

History 
Gerhardt wrote the text of the song in ten stanzas of four lines each. Johann Crüger composed a melody to fit and published it, first with the incipit "Lobet den Herren alle, die ihn fürchten" (... who fear him), in 1653 in the fifth edition of his hymnal Praxis Pietatis Melica, in a section "Tägliche Morgengesänge" (daily morning songs). It is part of many hymnals in German. Georg Thurmair included it as one of several songs by Protestant authors in his hymnal Kirchenlied in 1938 in the section Morning. It is part of the Protestant Evangelisches Gesangbuch (1995) as EG 447, and the Catholic Gotteslob (2013), as GL 81, however without stanzas 4, 5 and 9.

The first line decorates a plaque for Paul Gerhardt at the Nikolaikirche in Berlin where he was minister.

Text 
The poem has ten stanzas, each with three lines of eleven syllables and final line of five syllables, always the same picking up the first call, "Lobet den Herren". This Strophe format was often used in poetry of German  Humanism and Baroque, and was called Sapphic stanza. It is also used in hymns such as "Herzliebster Jesu" by Johann Heermann. The rhyming is unconventional, rhyming within the two halves of the first line, but leaving the final line without rhyme. All new hymnals change in the first line "fürchten" to "ehren" to comply with the scheme.

The repeated line "Lobet den Herren" has the same function as the biblical Hallelujah: both a call to praise, and the praise. Gerhardt uses it for a morning prayer, beginning the day with praise, motivated in stanzas 2 to 5 by thanks for protection from dangers of the night. They may have been inspired by dangers experienced in the Thirty Years' War. Stanzas 6 to 9 are a prayer for further for guidance on a way following divine sommandments, expecting the second coming of Christ ("deiner Zukunft"). The last stanza envisions, in an eschatological outlook, the ultimate praise in community with the angels.

Melody and musical settings 
Johann Crügers  in C major responds to the positive mood of the text. By changes of quarternotes and halfnotes, the rhythm of the Sapphic stanza is hidden. Crüger added a figured bass in his editions. The melody had baroque expressivity, but it often changed in modern editions, as also a syncope at the end of the third line.

Among the settings of the song is a cantata by Gustav Gunsenheimer for soloists, choir and instruments to his own melody.

References

External links 

 
 
 Lobet den Herren alle, die ihn ehren johann-crueger.de
 Lobet den Herren alle, die ihn ehren Christliche Liederdatenbank

Lutheran hymns
17th-century hymns in German
1653 works
Hymns by Paul Gerhardt